Peak or The Peak may refer to:

Basic meanings

Geology
 Mountain peak
 Pyramidal peak, a mountaintop that has been sculpted by erosion to form a point

Mathematics
 Peak hour or rush hour, in traffic congestion
 Peak (geometry), an (n-3)-dimensional element of a polytope
 Peak electricity demand or peak usage
 Peak-to-peak, the highest (or sometimes the highest and lowest) points on a varying waveform
 Peak (pharmacology), the time at which a drug reaches its maximum plasma concentration
 Peak experience, psychological term for a euphoric mental state

Resource production 
In terms of resource production, the peak is the moment when the production of a resource reaches a maximum level, after which it declines; in particular see:
 Peak oil
 Peak car
 Peak coal
 Peak copper
 Peak farmland
 Peak gas
 Peak gold
 Peak minerals
 Peak phosphorus
 Peak uranium
 Peak water
 Peak wheat
 Peak wood

Other basic meanings
 Visor, a part of a hat, known as a "peak" in British English
 Peaked cap

Geography
 Peak District in the Midlands of England
 The Peak, summit of Kinder Scout, the highest point in the Peak District
 Ravenscar, North Yorkshire, a village in England formerly known as "Peak" and "The Peak"
 The Peak (Hong Kong), also known as Victoria Peak
 Victoria Peak (disambiguation)
 Peak, a village in Ya Tung, Cambodia

People 
 Bob Peak (1927–1992), American commercial illustrator
 Howard W. Peak (b. 1948), American politician
 Jill Peak, British dog breeder and Crufts judge

Products and brands
 BIAS Peak, a professional audio editing program on the Apple platform
 GeeksPhone Peak, a mobile phone
 PEAKS, a software program for tandem mass spectroscopy
 Peak Sport Products, a Chinese sneaker brand
 The Peak Twin Towers, an apartment building in Jakarta, Indonesia
 Peak (automotive products), a manufacturer of automotive products
 Healthpeak Properties, an American real estate company having stock that trades under the symbol PEAK

Transportation
 A nickname used to refer to the British Rail Class 44 diesel locomotives, and also classes 45 and 46
 The highest corner of a four-sided, fore-aft sail
 PRS Peak, a German mountain descent paraglider design
 The Peak Terminus, Hong Kong

Media and entertainment
 The Peak (newspaper), a student newspaper of Simon Fraser University in Burnaby, British Columbia, Canada
 The Peak (TV series), a TV series in Singapore
 CFBV, a radio station branded as The Peak based in Smithers, British Columbia
 98.7 The Peak, a radio station in Phoenix, Arizona
 100.5 The Peak, a radio station based in Vancouver, British Columbia
 107.1 The Peak, a radio station based in White Plains, New York
 CKCB-FM, a radio station branded as 95.1 The Peak FM based in Collingwood, Ontario
 KPEK, a radio station on 100.3 FM branded as The Peak based in Albuquerque, New Mexico
 Peak: Secrets from the New Science of Expertise, a 2016 book
 Peak (novel), by Roland Smith
 Peak Records, a record label
"Peak", song by Drake from Scorpion
"Peak", song by Anne-Marie from Speak Your Mind

Other uses
 Peak Alternative High School, former school in Michigan, US

See also
 Peaking (disambiguation)
 Peek (disambiguation)
 Pique (disambiguation)